Ignas Gelžinis (born 28 February 1991) is a Lithuanian racing driver, currently racing in Porsche Carrera Cup Great Britain championship. His older brother Jonas Gelžinis is also racing driver.

Career Summary

2012–2014: Renault Clio Cup United Kingdom
From 2012 to 2013 Ignas Gelžinis competed in Renault Clio Cup United Kingdom. In his rookie year Ignas Gelžinis took 10th place in final standings with 152 points. 

2013 season was less successful: Ignas Gelžinis took 15th place in final standings with 106 points.

2014: Porsche GT3 Cup Challenge Central Europe

In 2014, Ignas Gelžinis moved to Porsche GT3 Cup Challenge Central Europe. After difficult start of the season in Hungaroring, Ignas Gelžinis scored his first podium finish in second round of the season in Poznan Circuit, finishing both races in top three. The following round in Salzburgring was even more successful. Ignas Gelžinis took his first victory with Porsche in the second race of the weekend. In the following round at Autodrom Most, Ignas Gelžinis finished on podium twice and moved into third place in the standings. More podium finishes came in fifth round at Slovakiaring and victory in Poznan Circuit allowed Ignas Gelžinis to move to second place in the standings. Two second-place finishes in final round of the season was not enough to win the championship and Ignas Gelžinis ended the season in second place with 218 points, 18 points less than winner Stefan Bilinski.

2015–present: Porsche Carrera Cup Great Britain
In 2015, Ignas Gelžinis returned to United Kingdom to compete in Porsche Carrera Cup Great Britain. After four championship rounds, he was leading Pro-AM1 class standings. He lost the lead to Jordan Witt after rounds in Snetterton and Knockhill, but after few more wins in his class at Silverstone and Brands Hatch, I.Gelžinis returned to top position and with 154 points became a Pro-AM1 champion in his rookie years.

References

External links
 
 

1991 births
Living people
Lithuanian racing drivers
Porsche Carrera Cup GB drivers
Renault UK Clio Cup drivers
24H Series drivers